A Grand Day Out with Wallace and Gromit, later marketed as A Grand Day Out, is a 1989 British stop-motion animated short film starring Wallace and Gromit. It was directed, co-written, and animated by Nick Park at the National Film and Television School in Beaconsfield and Aardman Animations in Bristol.

The short premiered on 4 November 1989, at an animation festival at the Arnolfini Gallery in Bristol. It was first broadcast on 24 December 1990, Christmas Eve, on Channel 4. A Grand Day Out is followed in the series by 1993's The Wrong Trousers, 1995's A Close Shave, 2005's The Curse of the Were-Rabbit and 2008's A Matter of Loaf and Death.

The short was nominated for an Academy Award for Best Animated Short Film in 1991, but it lost to Creature Comforts, another stop-motion animated short film made by Nick Park and Aardman Animations, also released in 1989.

Plot
Cheese-loving inventor Wallace and his dog Gromit, while trying to decide where they will spend their bank holiday, find that their house is bereft of cheese. As "everybody knows the Moon is made of cheese", they decide to build a rocket and fly to the Moon. Upon arrival, they begin sampling and gathering cheese, and encounter a coin-operated robot. Wallace inserts a coin, but nothing happens. After he and Gromit leave, the robot comes to life and gathers the dirty plates left at their picnic spot.

The robot discovers Wallace's skiing magazine, and yearns to travel to Earth to ski for itself. It repairs a broken piece of the Moon that Wallace had cut off, issues a parking ticket for the rocket, and becomes annoyed by an oil leakage from the craft. The robot sneaks up on Wallace and prepares to strike him, but the money Wallace inserted runs out, and it freezes. Wallace takes the robot's baton as a souvenir, inserts another coin as payment, and prepares to leave with Gromit and the cheese they have gathered.

Returning to life, the robot realizes Wallace and Gromit can bring it to Earth, and follows them. Wallace panics, thinking the robot is angry over the cheese he is taking with him, and he and Gromit retreat into the rocket. Unable to climb up the ladder, the robot cuts into the fuselage using a can opener. Upon entering the dark engine section of the rocket, it lights a match and accidentally ignites some fuel. The resultant explosion throws it off the rocket, and Wallace and Gromit lift off. Initially distraught at losing its chance to go to Earth, the robot fashions dislodged scraps of the rocket fuselage into skis, and starts skiing across the lunar landscape. It waves goodbye to Wallace and Gromit as they return home. During the credits, a ball previously kicked by Wallace drifts into space.

Production
Nick Park started creating the film in 1982, as a graduation project for the National Film and Television School. In 1985, Aardman Animations took him on before he finished the piece, allowing him to work on it part-time while still being funded by the school. To make the film, Park wrote to William Harbutt's company, requesting  of Plasticine.

The block he received had ten colours, one of which was called "stone"; this was used for Gromit. Park wanted to voice Gromit, but he realised the voice he had in mind — that of Peter Hawkins — would have been difficult to animate. For Wallace, Park offered Peter Sallis £50 to voice the character, and the actor's acceptance greatly surprised the young animator.

Park wanted Wallace to have a Lancastrian accent like his own, but Sallis could only do a Yorkshire voice. Inspired by how Sallis drew out the word "cheese", Park chose to give Wallace large cheeks. When Park called Sallis six years later to explain he had completed his film, Sallis swore in surprise.

Gromit was named after grommets, because Park's brother, an electrician, often mentioned them, and Nick Park liked the sound of the word. Wallace was originally a postman named Jerry, but Park felt the name did not match well with Gromit. Park saw an overweight Labrador Retriever named Wallace, who belonged to an old woman boarding a bus in Preston. Park commented it was a "funny name, a very northern name to give a dog".

According to the book The World of Wallace and Gromit, original plans were that the film would be forty minutes long, including a sequence where Wallace and Gromit would discover a fast food restaurant on the Moon. Regarding the original plot, Park said:

Home media
The short film was released on VHS in the 1990s by BBC Video. It was also released on DVD in Wallace and Gromit in 3 Amazing Adventures in 2005 by DreamWorks Home Entertainment. In the United States, it was released on DVD in 2009 by Lionsgate Home Entertainment and HIT Entertainment. In the United Kingdom, it was again released on DVD in the 2000s.

Lionsgate Home Entertainment later released it on Blu-ray for the first time, under the release's name Wallace and Gromit: The Complete Collection, on 22 September 2009 in time for the duo's 20th anniversary of the franchise.

Release
The short premiered on 4 November 1989 at the Arnolfini Gallery in Bristol, UK, and premiered in the United States on 18 May 1990. It was also shown on Channel 4 on 24 December 1990 in the UK.

Reception

Critical response
On Rotten Tomatoes, the film has a  approval rating based on  reviews, with an average rating of 8.2/10.

Awards and nominations
The short won the first BAFTA Award for Best Short Animation awarded in 1990, beating out Park's other nominated short, Creature Comforts.

However, in 1991, the opposite occurred, with the short being nominated for the Academy Award for Best Animated Short Film, but losing it to Creature Comforts.

References

External links

 Official Wallace and Gromit website
 

1980s children's fantasy films
1980s stop-motion animated films
1989 films
1980s science fiction films
1980s comedy films
1980s adventure comedy films
1989 short films
Aardman Animations short films
Animated comedy films
British animated short films
British animated science fiction films
British buddy films
British space adventure films
Clay animation films
Films directed by Nick Park
Films about dogs
Films about travel
Films set in Lancashire
Films with screenplays by Nick Park
Moon in film
Stop-motion animated short films
Wallace and Gromit films
1980s English-language films
1980s British films
British independent films